The Brooklyn Invitational Stakes (formerly known as the Brooklyn Handicap) is an American Thoroughbred horse race run annually in early June at Belmont Park in Elmont, New York, on Long Island.  It currently is a Grade II event open to four-year-olds and up willing to race one and one-half miles on dirt. It was a Grade 1 race prior to 1993.

Historical notes
First run on May 14, 1887 at Gravesend Race Track on Coney Island, New York, it was won by Emery & Cotton's Dry Monopole in track record time for the mile and one-quarter distance. A versatile horse, a year earlier on June 15, 1886 Dry Monopole had won America's first ever Thoroughbred flat race on turf. The Brooklyn Handicap quickly became one of the top attractions on the New York racing circuit, drawing some of the best Thoroughbreds.

Not run 1911–1912 due to the New York's Hart–Agnew Law which banned parimutuel betting

The race was once the second leg of what is sometimes referred to as the New York Handicap Triple series of races. It was preceded by the Metropolitan Handicap and followed by the Suburban Handicap. Four horses won the Handicap Triple:
 Whisk Broom II (1913)
 Tom Fool (1953)
 Kelso (1961)
 Fit to Fight (1984)

The race is currently run on the same day as the Metropolitan Handicap, so it is no longer possible to win the Handicap Triple.

Since inception the race has been held at:
 Gravesend Race Track : 1887–1910 
 Not run 1911–1912
 Old Aqueduct Racetrack : 1914–1944, 1946–1955
 Jamaica Race Course : 1956, 1958–1959
 Aqueduct Racetrack : 1960–1974, 1976
 Belmont Park : 1957, 1975, 1977 to present

The Brooklyn Handicap has been contested at a variety of distances:
  miles : 1915–1939, 1994–2007
  miles : 1956–1959, 1972–1974
  miles : 1887–1914, 1940–1955, 1960–1971, 1975–1976
  miles : 1991–1993
  miles : 1977–1990, 2008 to present

Records
Stakes record: (at current distance of  miles)
 2:25.36 (2021) Lone Rock

Most wins:
 3 – Discovery (1934, 1935, 1936)
 3 – Forego (1974, 1975, 1976)

Most wins by a jockey:
 6 – Eddie Arcaro (1944, 1947, 1954, 1955, 1956, 1961)

Most wins by a trainer:
 7 – Sam Hildreth (1909, 1910, 1916, 1921, 1923, 1925)

Most wins by an owner:
 5 – James R. Keene (1895, 1901, 1905, 1907, 1908)
 5 – Greentree Stable (1943, 1944, 1953, 1958, 1963)

Winners

External links
 Video of the 1904 Running of the Brooklyn Handicap

References

Graded stakes races in the United States
Horse races in New York (state)
Open middle distance horse races
Gravesend Race Track
Jamaica Race Course
Belmont Park
Recurring sporting events established in 1887
1887 establishments in New York (state)